Vijayabahu II (1186–1187) was king of the Kingdom of Polonnaruwa, in what is now Sri Lanka. He was the nephew of his predecessor, Parakramabahu I.

See also
 Mahavamsa
 List of monarchs of Sri Lanka
 History of Sri Lanka

References

External links
 Kings & Rulers of Sri Lanka
 Codrington's Short History of Ceylon

Monarchs of Polonnaruwa
V
V
V